Petter Eliassen (born December 1, 1985) is a Norwegian  cross-country skier who has competed since 2004. His best World Cup finish was second in a 4 × 10 km relay event in Finland in March 2010. He won the Vasaloppet in 2015 and 2020, and Birkebeinerrennet in 2015.

Cross-country skiing results
All results are sourced from the International Ski Federation (FIS).

World Championships

World Cup

Season standings

Team podiums
 1 podium – (1 )

References

External links

1985 births
Living people
Norwegian male cross-country skiers
Vasaloppet winners
Sportspeople from Trondheim